The tzouras, is a Greek stringed musical instrument related to the bouzouki.
Its name comes from the Turkish cura. It is made in six-string and eight-string varieties.

The six-string model has the same arrangement of strings tuned to the same pitches as the six-string (trichordo) bouzouki. There are three pairs of strings, tuned to D3D4–A3A3–D4D4 or
D4D3–A3A3–D4D4. The strings are made of steel.

The tzouras is about the same length as the bouzouki, with a similar neck and head, but with a much smaller body, giving it a distinctive tone.

Notable players
Saro Tribastone
Mikal Cronin

See also
Baglamas
Greek musical instruments
Greek music
Pandura
Cretan lyra

References

Greek music
String instruments